Garfield's Pet Force is a 2009 computer-animated superhero comedy film based on characters from the Jim Davis comic strip Garfield and loosely based on the Pet Force novel series. It is the third and final installment of the trilogy, following Garfield Gets Real and Garfield's Fun Fest. It was released on DVD and Blu-ray Disc on June 16, 2009. It was written by Garfield creator Jim Davis. It was released theatrically in 3-D in select countries such as Poland, Italy and Spain, and became the most profitable film in the trilogy. It is the last Garfield film to be distributed by 20th Century Fox (who lost the film and television rights to Garfield franchise shortly after the film's release), ten years prior to Nickelodeon's acquisition of Paws, Inc. in August 2019, as well as the upcoming animated Garfield film which will be distributed by Sony Pictures and produced by Alcon Entertainment, and was set to be released in 2024.

Summary

When Vetvix comes to Comic Strip World to go after Garzooka. Garzooka enlists Garfield, Nermal, Arlene, and Odie to help him stop Vetvix by becoming the Pet Force. However, Garfield would rather eat and sleep than help save the world and he saw this as too much work. When Vetvix starts threatening Garfield's world, Garfield realizes what's really at stake. Will Garfield stop being lazy and help the Pet Force, and save the world?

Plot
On the planet Dorkon, Professor Wally (the professor counterpart to Wally) shows Emperor Jon (the emperor counterpart to Jon Arbuckle) his new invention, the Moscram ray gun, a device powered by the Klopman crystal that can scramble inanimate objects and organisms into new creatures under the user's control, but the Emperor is more concerned about finding a wife to continue the royal line. Soon a warship led by Vetvix (the super-villain counterpart to Liz) lands outside the palace and Emperor Jon instantly falls in love with her, asking if he can marry her. She agrees, but only because she wanted to steal the Moscram. She zombifies the Emperor's guards, forcing Professor Wally to summon the Pet Force: Garzooka (Garfield's superhero counterpart), Odious (Odie's superhero counterpart), Abnermal (Nermal's superhero counterpart), and Starlena (Arlene's superhero counterpart), to save them but Vetvix zombifies the Pet Force except Garzooka. Garzooka manages to get hold of the Klopman and escapes with the Professor in a secret passageway. The professor uses his computer to search the universe for counterparts with DNA matches with the Pet Force & when he does, he gives Garzooka their pictures and serums that will transform them into the Pet Force, who then takes off to the Comic World leaving Professor Wally & Vetvix, who's vowing for revenge, behind.

The situation was revealed to be a comic book Nermal was reading during a cookout with Jon and the gang. Nermal is really excited about getting the next 100th edition issue. Garfield's friends go to the Comic Studios to work their new strip without Garfield, who wants to finish all the hot dogs. Nermal gets the new Pet Force issue from a news stand, with Garzooka jumping out of a comic book afterwards. Nermal finds that the events that are happening to them are in the comic book, and the rest of the book is blank because they have not happened yet. Garzooka heads for Jon's house, and is told where Odie, Arlene, and Nermal are by Garfield. Garzooka gives Garfield the Klopman as well, telling him to protect it.

In the living room at the Comic Studios, Nermal, Arlene, and Odie notice Garzooka behind them after Nermal sees this in his comic book. Garzooka hands them the serums, asking them to help him stop Vetvix. But they don't change immediately after they drink the serums. However, it's time for Odie, Arlene, and Nermal to go to work and Garzooka follows. Meanwhile, the real Garfield is enjoying a relaxing day all to himself, but is captured by Vetvix, who mistakes him for Garzooka (as his DNA is similar to Garzooka's) and threatens him for the Klopman, but to no avail because Garfield is a cartoon character. Garfield tries to protect the Klopman by putting it in his mouth, but eventually Vetvix's guards get it. Garfield is told by Professor Wally to go over to Emperor Jon who then tells him to grab the Professor's lens and put it on the window. The sunlight loosens the Emperor and the professor's ropes while Vetvix orders her guards to get rid of Garfield, they then throw him down the garbage chute.
  
Back at Comic Studios, the gang is interrupted by Vetvix, who zombifies most of the characters at the studio with the Moscram. Nermal, Odie, Arlene, Jon, and Garzooka escape to the back alley and meet up with Garfield. Nermal, Odie, and Arlene's serum kick in and transform into their Pet Force counterparts. Garzooka and his team then go off to fight Vetvix, and head technician Eli saves Garfield by sucking him up an air vent, but Jon gets zombified with a nearby trash can. Vetvix causes chaos, zombifying all of Toon World, as the citizens of Toon World try to make a run for it but are unsuccessful. Eli scolds Garfield for not helping Garzooka and being so lazy. Eli and Garfield manage to find three survivors: inventor Wally Stegman, his wife Bonita and assistant director Betty. Garfield names himself and the survivors "The Crazy Crew" and forms a plan to help Garzooka's crew and to stop Vetvix. Meanwhile, the zombies break into the tower, making the Pet Force escape to the top. Garzooka realizes the zombies are too much for them as his allies start to feel weakened and outnumbered. Garfield and Wally pretend to be zombies, then disguise themselves as Vetvix and then Garzooka and get the zombies attention, making the zombies chase them to the Comic Studio, and Eli opens the pit in the filming area, in which the zombies fall into. The real Garzooka and the Pet Force head to the antenna and use it to bring down Vetvix's ship, but Vetvix fires up the Moscram, using the untested super scramble mode, zombifing the Pet Force & creating a monster made from the town's buildings.

Emperor Jon and Professor Wally break free, and take over the ship, flying into the air, making Vetvix fall off. Meanwhile, Vetvix's ship (with Professor Wally and Emperor Jon controlling it) lands near the back alley of Comic Studio, and the Crazy Crew meet Emperor Jon and Professor Wally, who let Garfield enter the ship. Garfield seizes control of the Moscram from Vetvix & dezombifies the Pet Force and destroys the monster. Upon returning to the studio, Garfield uses the Moscram to combine Vetvix with the new smile section, an invention that makes people happy that Betty made, turning her into a good guy. Finally, Garfield has Eli open the pit so he could use the Moscram to reverse the zombification on everyone else. Vetvix sees Emperor Jon and apologizes for her behavior and accepts the emperor's marriage proposal for real this time. The Pet force turn back into their original forms with a reversal serum. Garzooms gives Nermal an Abnermal costume before leaving with Vetvix, Emperor Jon, and Professor Wally, the latter vowing to destroy the Moscram after reversing the damage on Dorkon.

After the Pet Force cast returns to their comic book world, the Toon World residents start rebuilding their civilization and watch Emperor Jon and Vetvix’s wedding on the screen. That evening, Garfield and Arlene have a heart to heart later when Garfield decides to stop missing out on life so much and the two of them are then seen taking off to the stars for a dance.

During the credits, while watching Emperor Jon's wedding, not only does Jon notice the real Pet Force in attendance, the gang see that Betty has stowed away on the ship to follow Garzooka, whom she's in love with. Much to the shock of Betty’s husband Charles. Arlene points out that he now needs a new assistant. A position Nermal is eager to take.

Cast
 Frank Welker as Garfield / Garzooka / Narrator / Monster / Additional Voices
 Gregg Berger as Odie / Odious
 Audrey Wasilewski as Arlene / Starlena
 Jason Marsden as Nermal / Abnermal
 Vanessa Marshall as Vetvix
 Wally Wingert as Jon Arbuckle / Emperor Jon
 Fred Tatasciore as Billy Bear / Horned Guard
 Greg Eagles as Eli
 Jennifer Darling as Betty / Bonita Stegman
 Stephen Stanton as Randy Rabbit / Additional Voices
 Neil Ross as Wally / Charles / Professor Wally

Reception

Box office 
The film opened in twenty countries. Like Garfield's Fun Fest, the film's most profitable market was Brazil, where it took in more than $2.4 million. It opened third at the box office with $609,773, and dropped 53.5% to sixth in its sophomore weekend, grossing $283,558.

Critical response 
Joly Herman of Common Sense Media gave the film a 1 out of 5 star review, stating: "Kids who love Garfield are better off checking out the TV series or even the live-action movie".

See also
 Pet Force

References

External links
 
 

2009 direct-to-video films
2009 films
2000s children's comedy films
2000s English-language films
American children's animated comic science fiction films
American children's animated science fantasy films
American children's animated superhero films
20th Century Fox animated films
American computer-animated films
Davis Entertainment films
Direct-to-video animated films
Garfield films
Films with screenplays by Jim Davis (cartoonist)
20th Century Fox direct-to-video films
Animated films based on comics
Animated films directed by Mark A.Z. Dippé
2009 comedy films
2000s American films
Animated films about cats